Diary of an Oxygen Thief is a 2006 Dutch novel, written by Anonymous and published in Amsterdam by NLVI. Diary of an Oxygen Thief was called a "surprise dark-horse Williamsburg best seller" by New York Magazine, referring to the independent art, literature, and  music scene in Brooklyn, New York.

Summary
Purporting to be an autobiography, Diary of an Oxygen Thief begins with the narrator, an Irish advertising executive living in London, describing the pleasure he used to receive from emotionally abusing women.  After the narrator starts attending AA meetings, he sobers up and looks back on his past relationships with a measure of remorse. After taking a job in the United States, the narrator is confronted externally by the  absurdity of corporate America, culture shock, and the conflict of moving from the lower to upper-middle class. Internally he grapples with paranoia, addiction, and a legacy of pain.  Later, he meets a young, aspiring photographer in New York and falls in love with her.
	
The "Oxygen Thief" in the title refers to narrator's low self-esteem. Because of his sense of self-loathing he seems to go through life unworthy of the very air he breathes.

Reception
Diary of an Oxygen Thief quickly became popular from its initial publication in 2006 to 2016 where it was listed on both Amazon and iTunes 20 top selling books.

See also

 Chameleon in a Candy Store

References

External links
www.02thief.com
nymag.com/guides/valentines/53552

Alcoholics Anonymous
2006 novels
21st-century Dutch novels
Self-published books
Memoirs
English-language novels
Fiction with unreliable narrators
Novels set in New York City
Novels set in London
Novels set in Minnesota
2006 debut novels
Works published anonymously